The 2005 Men's Hockey Champions Challenge took place in Alexandria, Egypt from April 1–9, 2005. 

Argentina earned a spot at the 2006 Champions Trophy in Terrassa, Spain after defeated Korea in the final.

Squads

Head Coach: Jorge Ruiz

Head Coach: Giles Bonnet

Head Coach: Gerhard Rach

Head Coach: Jason Lee

Head Coach: Paul Revington

Head Coach: Cho Myung-Jun

Umpires
Below is the eight umpires appointed by International Hockey Federation (FIH):

Results
All times are Eastern European Time (UTC+02:00)

Pool

Classification

Fifth and sixth place

Third and fourth place

Final

Awards
Top Scorers
 Jean-Philippe Brulé
 Lee Jung-Seon
Player of the Tournament
 Germán Orozco

Statistics

Final ranking

References

External links
Official FIH website
Official website
Official website

C
F
International field hockey competitions hosted by Egypt
Men's Hockey Champions Challenge I